Mei Xiwen (born October 8, 1982) is a Chinese former professional snooker player.

Career

Mei made his debut on the Main Tour in the 2009/2010 season, as the ACBS Asian nomination, playing his first match at the 2009 Grand Prix. He lost 5–0 to Patrick Wallace, and was defeated in his next two matches, in the UK Championship and the Welsh Open, to Atthasit Mahitthi and Stephen Rowlings respectively. Mei recorded his first win as a professional in the 2010 China Open, where he beat Noppadol Sangnil 5–4, having trailed 4–2, but lost in the next round, 5–1 to Robert Milkins. After losing in qualifying for the 2010 World Championship to David Morris, Mei finished the season ranked 89th, and was relegated from the tour thereafter.

Mei received a wildcard entry in to the 2010 Shanghai Masters and beat Mike Dunn 5–1, before losing 5–2 to Mark Selby. He also played in the wildcard round of the China Open and lost 5–3 to Marcus Campbell, as well as being unsuccessful at Q School. Over the next five seasons he only played in Asian Tour events and whilst he never made it beyond the fourth round, he did record wins over experienced players such as Mark Davis, Mark King and Xiao Guodong.

In 2016, Mei was given the Chinese nomination for a two-year professional tour place starting with the 2016/2017 season.
In qualifying for the 2016 Shanghai Masters, Mei defeated Sanderson Lam 5–2, Gary Wilson 5–3, Dominic Dale 5–1 and Graeme Dott 5–0 to reach the televised stages in Shanghai. At the venue, he beat two-time world champion Mark Williams 5–3 to reach the last 16 of a ranking event for the first time in his career. He faced Ryan Day for a place in the quarter-finals, with Day pulling away from 2–2 to win 5–2. Mei defeated Jack Lisowski 6–5 and Martin Gould 6–3 at the UK Championship and then lost 6–4 to Marco Fu. He reached the last 16 of the Welsh Open with victories over Matthew Selt, Peter Ebdon and Mark Allen, but was beaten 4–2 by Robert Milkins.

In 2019, Mei reached quarter-final in English open after defeating Ronnie O'Sullivan in round of last 16. His opponent in quarter-final was eventual winner Mark Selby, who beat Mei 3–5.

Mei returned to China after losing in the 2nd round of the 2020 Gibraltar Open due to the ongoing COVID-19 pandemic, and hasn't entered any events since then. As a result, he dropped out of the top 64 at the end of the 2020–21 season and was relegated from tour, despite attaining his career ranking high of 55 at the start of the season.

Performance and rankings timeline

Career finals

Amateur finals: 1

References

External links

 
Mei Xiwen at worldsnooker.com
 Profile on Global Snooker

Chinese snooker players
Living people
1982 births
21st-century Chinese people